Bahaa Trabelsi (born 1966) is a Moroccan novelist.

Trabelsi was born in Rabat and went to secondary school in Morocco and then she emigrated to France. After her graduation in France (troisième cycle) she returned to Morocco for some time. She now holds a Doctorate degree in economic studies from the university of Aix en Provence. She is the author of the successful novel "Une femme simplement" (1995). "Une Vie à trois" is her second novel. Bahaa has worked in a government job and is now a journalist and head of the Moroccan magazine "Masculin" and prominent member of an association fighting Aids.
Her third novel is "Slim".

Bahaa Trabelsi is an active member of civil society and has participated in the creation of several associations, including Women and Development. The Keeper's Chair is her fifth novel and won the 2017 Sofitel Literary Award. Tahar Ben Jelloun was the chairman of the jury that awarded the award on that occasion.

Books 

 A THREE LIFE (UNE VIE A TROIS) December 30, 1999
A Woman Simply (Une Femme Tout Simplement) 1995
Slim, Women and Death (Slim, les Femmes et la Mort)

References

External links
 Interview with Trabelsi
 Article by Trabelsi

Moroccan women novelists
Moroccan novelists
Living people
1966 births
Writers from Rabat
20th-century Moroccan women writers
21st-century Moroccan women writers
20th-century Moroccan writers
21st-century Moroccan writers